Niamh Campbell is an Irish author.

Works 
 We Were Young 
 Love Many
 This Happy

Awards 
 Sunday Times Short Story Award in 2020 for Love Many
 Rooney Prize for Irish Literature in 2021 for This Happy
 Shortlisted for Kerry Group Irish Fiction Award

References 

Irish writers
Living people
Year of birth missing (living people)